Argyra albicans is a species of long-legged fly in the family Dolichopodidae.

References

Diaphorinae
Articles created by Qbugbot
Insects described in 1861
Diptera of North America
Taxa named by Hermann Loew